Temple Carrig School (also known as Temple Carrig Secondary School) is a mixed, Church of Ireland, voluntary secondary school in Greystones, County Wicklow, Ireland. It was established in September 2014 and is under the patronage of the Church of Ireland. It is the first Church of Ireland voluntary secondary school to be established since the foundation of the Irish Free State.

Curriculum 
Students study the Junior Cycle curriculum for their first three years, the Transition Year syllabus (compulsory) for their fourth, and the Leaving Certificate curriculum for their final two.

Extracurricular activities 
The school competes at a  low level in rugby.

Controversy 
In 2015, the school became known for depriving students of McDonald's fast food.Mc Donald’s tried to fight back for the good of the students but sadly Temple Carrig won.

References

External links 
 

Greystones
Secondary schools in County Wicklow
Anglican schools in the Republic of Ireland
Educational institutions established in 2014
2014 establishments in Ireland